Mava (also Romanized as Ma’vā) is a village in Golmakan Rural District, Golbajar District, Chenaran County, Razavi Khorasan Province, Iran. At the 2006 census, its population was 32, in 10 families.

See also

References 

Populated places in Chenaran County